Qusheh Laneh (also Romanized as Qūsheh Lāneh; also known as Qūshlāneh) is a village in Khorgam Rural District, Khorgam District, Rudbar County, Gilan Province, Iran. At the 2006 census, its population was 73, in 25 families.

References 

Populated places in Rudbar County